Mehdi Hasan Khan is a Bangladeshi physician and software developer. He is known for inventing free and open source Bengali keyboard Avro in 2003.

Early life
Khan was born in Dhaka on July 23, 1986. After completing his secondary from Ideal School and College and higher secondary from Notre Dame College, Khan obtained his MBBS degree from Mymensingh Medical College in 2010.

Avro

Khan started developing Avro for Windows in 2003 when he was a first year student of Mymensingh Medical College. It was first published on web for free download on March 26, 2003, under Creative Commons Attribution-NoDerivs 3.0 Unported License. Initially, it was developed in Visual Basic, which was later rewritten in Delphi. After discussion, OmicronLab published the source code of windows version under MPL 1.1 license with the Avro Keyboard 5.0.5 public beta 1. Avro was further developed by M. M. Rifat-Un-Nabi, Tanbin Islam Siyam, Ryan Kamal, Shabab Mustafa and Nipon Haque from OmicronLab.

Later life 
After developing arvo keyboard as a side project, he fully involved his career as a backend software developer. Dr. Hasan have also worked in mPower Social Enterprises, Eniacs, Okdoit, HungryNaki, Backpack Technologies and ShopUp. During 2020 he shifted to Berlin as a Senior Backend Engineer of MoBerries. He is currently working as a Software Development Engineer at Contentful based in Berlin.

References

Bangladeshi physicians
Living people
1986 births
Notre Dame College, Dhaka alumni
People from Dhaka
Bangladeshi computer programmers